Haplochromis gracilior, known in Rwanda as the Boulenger's Kivu haplo and in the aquarium fish trade as Haplochromis 'torpedo stripe', is a species of cichlid fish endemic to Lake Kivu on the border of the Democratic Republic of the Congo and Rwanda.  This species can reach a length of  SL.

References

gracilior
Fish described in 1914
Taxonomy articles created by Polbot